The fourth season of SEAL Team, an American military action drama television series, began airing on CBS on December 2, 2020, and ended on May 26, 2021 with 16 episodes.

For the 2020–21 U.S. television season, the fourth season of SEAL Team ranked 38th with an average of 6.44 million viewers.

Cast and characters

Main 
 David Boreanaz as Master Chief Special Warfare Operator Jason Hayes a.k.a. Bravo 1/1B
 Max Thieriot as Special Warfare Operator Second Class Clay Spenser a.k.a. Bravo 6/6B
 Jessica Paré as Amanda "Mandy" Ellis (episodes 1–2)
 Neil Brown Jr. as Chief Warrant Officer 2 Raymond "Ray" Perry, a.k.a. Bravo 2/2B
 A. J. Buckley as Special Warfare Operator First Class Sonny Quinn a.k.a. Bravo 3/3B
 Toni Trucks as Lieutenant (junior grade) Lisa Davis
 Judd Lormand as Commander Eric Blackburn (episode 1)

Recurring 
 Tyler Grey as Special Warfare Operator First Class Trent Sawyer a.k.a. Bravo 4/4B
 Jusitin Melnick as Special Warfare Operator First Class Brock Reynolds a.k.a. Bravo 5/5B
 Kerri Medders as Emma Hayes
 Parisa Fakhri as Naima Perry
 Ammon Jacob Ford as Michael "Mikey" Hayes
 Alona Tal as Stella Baxter
 Scott Foxx as Senior Chief Special Warfare Operator Scott "Full Metal" Carter a.k.a. Bravo 7/7B
 Tim Chiou as Special Warfare Operator Michael "Thirty Mike" Chen a.k.a. Charlie 2/2C

 Note:

Episodes

Production 
On May 6, 2020, CBS renewed the series for a fourth season.

Ratings

Home media

References 

2020 American television seasons
2021 American television seasons
Television productions postponed due to the COVID-19 pandemic